The Klejnárka is a river which flows through the Central Bohemian Region of the Czech Republic. It is a left tributary of the Elbe.

It flows northward through the towns of Čáslav and Nové Dvory (where it is joined by its largest tributary, the Vrchlice. From here it flows another  northward to join the Elbe river in Starý Kolín.

References

Rivers of the Central Bohemian Region